The Association for Perioperative Practice (AfPP) is a British professional body for healthcare workers. Its stated aims include "the promotion of high standards of perioperative care, the exchange of professional information between members and co-operation with other professional bodies". It is a registered charity. It was established as the National Association of Theatre Nurses (NATN) in 1964.  it claims to have 7,000 members.

References

 About AfPP Association for Preoperative Practice. Retrieved 13 April 2018.

External links
 
 

Surgical organisations based in the United Kingdom
Organisations based in Harrogate
1964 establishments in the United Kingdom
Organizations established in 1964